Jamin Ruhren (born December 10, 1977), better known by the stage name Acid Betty, is an American drag queen, performer, actor and singer. He rose to national prominence after competing on the eighth season of RuPaul's Drag Race in 2016.

Early life 
Ruhren first wore drag when he was very young, masquerading as his sister’s “cousin from out of town” as a practical joke, where he wore his sister’s cheerleader pompoms to act as his hair and breasts. He later said that that was when he first knew he would pass as a female in the future, even if he looked like “a fat Raggedy Ann”.  Ruhren went to his first drag club when he was 17, where he saw Raja perform. He is Jewish.

Career 

Before his appearance on RuPaul's Drag Race, Betty was a guest for an episode of Project Runway, season five in 2008, where RuPaul was the guest judge. In 2009, Betty was in the film An Englishman in New York with John Hurt. In 2010, she appeared in an eight episode web series documentary, Queens of Drag: NYC with Peppermint, Bianca Del Rio and Mimi Imfurst. She has served as Ringleader at the Lincoln Center for New York City's "Rock and Roll Circus" in 2011.

Betty was announced to be one of twelve competing on season eight of RuPaul's Drag Race on February 1, 2016. She was eliminated in episode five after performing badly on the annual snatch game challenge, and later losing a lip sync to Madonna's "Causing a Commotion" against Naomi Smalls.

After the show, Betty made a cameo appearance in The Path in 2018.

In July 2020, Betty was featured in Drive N' Drag, a drive-in drag show.

Music 
In November 2011, Betty appeared in the music video for Cazwell's "Unzip Me". Betty released her first single, "Ruthless", on March 1, 2012. Her second single, "Fantasy", was released on May 15, 2016. The music video features season eight finalists Kim Chi and Bob the Drag Queen. A third single, "Acid (Drop)", was available three days later.

Personal life 
Ruhren is based in Brooklyn, New York.

Filmography

Film

Television

Music videos

Web series

Discography

Singles

See also
 LGBT culture in New York City
 List of LGBT people from New York City

References

External links 

 
 Acid Betty on Discogs

Living people
American drag queens
Artists from Brooklyn
Acid Betty
LGBT Jews
Jewish American male actors
Jewish singers
Singers from New York City
1977 births
LGBT people from New York (state)